Didier Akotia Tchalla (born 28 July 1981) is a retired Togolese triple jumper.

Career 
He finished fourth at the 2002 African Championships, sixth at the 2003 All-Africa Games, sixth at the 2005 Jeux de la Francophonie, ninth at the 2005 Islamic Solidarity Games and sixth at the 2006 African Championships.

His personal best jump is 16.18 metres, achieved in February 2003 in Port Elizabeth. This is the Togolese record.

Personal best

References

1981 births
Living people
Togolese male triple jumpers
Athletes (track and field) at the 2003 All-Africa Games
African Games competitors for Togo
21st-century Togolese people